COSMO is a German, public radio station owned and operated by the Westdeutscher Rundfunk (WDR), Radio Bremen (RB) and Rundfunk Berlin-Brandenburg (RBB). It is characterised by its engagement with topics from across Earth, aka Cosmos, questions of cultures and features regular broadcasts in different languages.

References

Westdeutscher Rundfunk
Radio Bremen
Rundfunk Berlin-Brandenburg
Radio stations in Germany
Radio stations established in 1998
1998 establishments in Germany
Mass media in Cologne
Mass media in Bremen (city)
Mass media in Berlin